A number of steamships have been named Dresden.
, a British passenger ship which operated, as such, from 1897 to 1915
, a Great Eastern Railway passenger ship in service 1897–1915
, a Norddeutscher Lloyd ocean liner in service 1927–34
 SS Dresden (1888), a Norddeutscher Lloyd ocean liner, known for the tragic Irish Argentine#The Dresden Affair

Ship names